Urrea is a Hispanic surname that may refer to
Albert Urrea (born 1987), Spanish football midfielder
Francisco Ximénez de Urrea (1589–1647), Spanish historian and writer
John Urrea (born 1955), American baseball player of Mexican descent
José de Urrea (1797–1849), Mexican general
Lourdes Urrea (born 1954), Mexican author, artist and speaker
Luis Alberto Urrea (born 1955), Mexican-American poet, novelist, and essayist
Misael Torres Urrea (born 1991/92), Mexican drug lord
Noah Urrea (born 2001), American actor, singer and model
Pedro Manuel Jiménez de Urrea (1486–1535), Spanish Renaissance poet and playwright
Teresa Urrea (1873–1906), Mexican folk healer

Spanish-language surnames